Mateusz Kudła (born September 16, 1991) is a Polish film producer, director, TV reporter, and YouTuber.

Early life 
Kudła was born on September 16, 1991 in Chicago, Illinois. His parents, Anna and Tomasz, moved the family back to Poland in 1992. He has dual citizenship, US and Polish.

Kudła's paternal great-grandparents, Jadwiga and Stanislaw Solecki were posthumously awarded the title of "Righteous Among the Nations" by Yad Vashem on August 25, 2015. They risked their lives during the Holocaust to save Jewish girl, Marlena Wagner, from extermination by the Nazis. In 2017 Mateusz Kudła started producing a documentary film about Marlena Madeleine Wagner-Alster, who came to Korczyna after over 70 years with her children and grandchildren to once again see the house where her life was saved.

Kudła studied American studies at the Jagiellonian University in Kraków.

Career 
Kudła began his career in 2010 in TVN, one of Poland's major television networks owned by Discovery Inc. Earlier he had been the picture editor in Onet.pl, the largest Polish web portal. He prepares news reports for TVN24, a Polish 24-hour commercial news channel, and Fakty TVN, the flagship newscast of TVN. In 2018 he was a TV editor of International Festival of Independent Cinema Off Camera.

In 2016 Kudła was awarded the Green Pear for outstanding journalistic achievements, in 2017 he was nominated to Bolesław Prus award by The Association of Journalists of the Republic of Poland.

For his first short documentary film, Depositary (2014), he was awarded on Southampton International Film Festival and has received two nominations on The Best Shorts Competition. His film The Photo Film People (2017) won the Gold Dolphin of the Cannes Corporate Media & TV Awards in France and the Gold Plaque of the Chicago International Film Festival Television Awards in United States.

In 2015 he directed documentary film Wilczur about Jacek Wilczur, member of the Main Commission for the Investigation of Nazi Crimes in Poland, explorer of the Project Riese undergrounds and the Home Army executioner in Holy Cross Mountains.

Kudła is director and producer of film Polanski, Horowitz. Hometown, with Oscar-winning director Roman Polanski's and New York photographer Ryszard Horowitz's participation, about their early life in Kraków Ghetto during the Holocaust and after the war in Poland.

Filmography 

Director and producer
 Polanski, Horowitz. Hometown – a KRK FILM production (2021)
 The Photo Film People – a TVN production (2017)
 Wilczur – a TVN production (2015)
 Depositary – a TVN production (2014)

Awards 

Film
 Audience Award of the Krakow Film Festival for Polanski, Horowitz. Hometown  (Poland, 2021)
 Special Mention in National Competition of the Krakow Film Festival for Polanski, Horowitz. Hometown  (Poland, 2021)
 Gold Dolphin of the Cannes Corporate Media & TV Awards for The Photo Film People  (France, 2017)
 Gold Plaque of the Chicago International Film Festival Television Awards for The Photo Film People  (United States, 2017)
 Humanitarian Honorable Mention of the Best Shorts Competition Humanitarian Award for the Depositary (United States, 2017)
 Award for editing on Southampton International Film Festival for Depositary  (United Kingdom, 2017)
 Award of Merit Special Mention on The Best Shorts Competition for Depositary (United States, 2016)

Journalism
 Audience Gold BohaterOn for History Hiking  (Poland, 2020)
 Bronze BohaterOn for History Hiking  (Poland, 2020)
 nomination for the Bolesław Prus award of the Association of Journalists of the Republic of Poland (Warsaw, 2017)
 Green Pear for outstanding journalistic achievements of the Association of Journalists of the Republic of Poland in Kraków (Kraków, 2016)

Other
 The Silver Creator Award  for History Hiking  (2020)

References

External links 

Mateusz Kudla on FilmPolski.pl
Mateusz Kudla on KRK FILM

1991 births
Living people
Polish documentary film directors
Polish film producers
Polish male writers
Polish screenwriters
Polish television journalists
Journalists from Kraków
Film people from Kraków